Thaddeus G. Mosley (born 1926) is an American sculptor who works mostly in wood and is based in Pittsburgh, Pennsylvania.

Biography
A native of New Castle, Pennsylvania, Mosley enlisted in the U.S. Navy, then graduated in 1950 from the University of Pittsburgh,  where he majored in English and journalism, then settled in Pittsburgh and took a job with the U.S. Postal Service. Some freelance journalism in the 1950s for the Pittsburgh Courier and various national magazines sparked his interest in carving and sculpture.

His solo and two-person exhibits include events at the Carnegie Museum of Art in 1968 and 1997; the Pittsburgh Center for the Arts (PCA)'s Artist of the Year show in 1979; the Three Rivers Arts Festival with Selma Burke in 1990; and the Manchester Craftsmen's Guild in 1995. His best-known sculptures in Pittsburgh are the 14-foot cedar Phoenix at the corner of Centre Avenue and Dinwiddie in the Hill District and the Mountaintop limestone at the Martin Luther King Jr. Library in the Hill District at Herron and Milwaukee Streets. He also is 1 of 32 artists to be featured in the 2018 Carnegie International.

Mosley's awards include the 1999 Governor's Award for Artist of the Year in Pennsylvania Visual Arts, the PCA 2000 Cultural Award, and the PCA 2002 Service to the Arts Award and Exhibition. The latter award, first awarded in 1997, is given to a member of the local arts community for demonstrating inspiration, involvement, commitment and passion for the arts. The Pittsburgh Tribune-Review called Mosley "a fixture at local art openings" and said:

A constant contributor to charity auctions (he recently donated two pieces to the Sharry Evrett Scholarship Award auction and created a penguin for Sweetwater Center for the Arts' Penguins on Parade auction), he also is widely respected as an instructor, having given countless workshops on woodcarving at colleges and art centers locally and regionally. Most notable has been the Touchstone Center for Crafts in Farmington, Fayette County, where he has taught wood sculpture every summer for more than 20 years.

His commissions include Three Rivers Bench in 2003 for the David L. Lawrence Convention Center; Legends at the Susquehanna Museum in Harrisburg, Pennsylvania, from December 2003 to March 2004; and an exhibition at the Cue Art Foundation Gallery in New York City in March 2004.

In 1997, Pittsburgh author David Lewis published Thaddeus Mosley: African-American Sculptor, a 97-page book published by the University of Pittsburgh Press.

His affiliations include many years as an officer of the Pittsburgh Society of Sculptors and service as a board member for the August Wilson Center for African American Culture.

A 45-minute documentary on Mosley's life, Thaddeus Mosley: Sculptor, was completed in 2012.

In October 2022, Mosley’s sculptures were part of the inaugural edition of Paris + par Art Basel.  Curated by Annabelle Ténèze, Director of Les Abattoirs, Thaddeus Mosley in La Suite de l’Histoire was exhibited at Musée National Eugène-Delacroix.

References

External links
1997 interview with Mosley
Thad Mosley's exhibit at the Cue Art Foundation Gallery in NYC

1926 births
Living people
African-American sculptors
20th-century American sculptors
20th-century American male artists
21st-century American sculptors
21st-century American male artists
American male sculptors
Artists from Pittsburgh
University of Pittsburgh alumni
People from New Castle, Pennsylvania
Sculptors from Pennsylvania
20th-century African-American artists
21st-century African-American artists